The Pyrgomorphinae are a sub-family of grasshoppers (Orthoptera : Caelifera) in the family Pyrgomorphidae.  Species are found in, especially the warmer parts of: Central and South America, southern Europe, Africa, Asia, Australia and Pacific Islands.  The type genus is Pyrgomorpha and names dates from "Pyrgomorphiden" by Brunner von Wattenwyl, 1874. The first use of Pyrgomorphinae was by Krauss in 1890.

Tribes and genera 
The Orthoptera Species File lists the following:

Atractomorphini 
Bolívar, 1905; Distribution: Africa, Asia, Australia

 Genus Atractomorpha
 Genus Occidentosphena
 Occidentosphena ruandensis
 Occidentosphena uvarovi

Chlorizeinini 
Kevan & Akbar, 1964; Distribution: Africa, Asia
 Sub-tribe Chlorizeinina Kevan & Akbar, 1964
 Genus Chlorizeina Brunner von Wattenwyl, 1893
 Genus Feacris Kevan, 1969
 Genus Pterorthacris Uvarov, 1921
 Sub-tribe Humpatellina Kevan & Akbar, 1964
 Genus Cawendia Karsch, 1888
 Genus Humpatella Karsch, 1896
 Genus Pseudorubellia Dirsh, 1963
 Sub-tribe Marsabitacridina Kevan & Akbar, 1964
 Genus Katangacris Kevan & Akbar, 1964
 Genus Marsabitacris Kevan, 1957

Chrotogonini
Bolívar, 1904; Distribution: Africa, Asia

 Genus Caconda Bolívar, 1884
 Genus Chrotogonus Serville, 1838
 Genus Shoacris Kevan, 1952
 Genus Stibarosterna Uvarov, 1953
 Genus Tenuitarsus Bolívar, 1904

Desmopterini 
Bolívar, 1905; Distribution: W. Africa, Asia, Australia
 Genus Apodesmoptera Rehn, 1951
 Genus Desmoptera Bolívar, 1884
 Desmoptera truncatipennis
 Genus Desmopterella Ramme, 1941
 Genus Doriaella Bolívar, 1898
 Genus Menesesia Willemse, 1922
 Genus Menesesiella Kevan, 1963
 Genus Paradoriaella Willemse, 1961
 Genus Stenoxyphellus Ramme, 1941
 Genus Stenoxyphula Kevan, 1963
 Genus Stenoxyphus Blanchard, 1853

Dictyophorini 
Kirby, 1902; Distribution: Africa

 Genus Camoensia
 Genus Dictyophorus: including Dictyophorus spumans
 Genus Loveridgacris
 Genus Maura
 Genus Parapetasia

Monistriini 
Kevan & Akbar, 1964; Distribution: Australia

 Genus Greyacris
 Greyacris profundesulcata
 Genus Monistria
 Genus Parastria
 Parastria reticulata
 Genus Pileolum
 Pileolum kirbyi
 Genus Yeelanna
 Yeelanna argus
 Yeelanna pavonina

Omurini 
Kevan, 1961; Distribution: South America
 Genus Algete (insect) Bolívar, 1905
 Genus Minorissa Walker, 1870
 Genus Omura (insect) Walker, 1870

Petasidini 
Key, 1985; Distribution: Australia
 Genus Petasida
 Petasida ephippigera (Leichhardt's grasshopper)
 Genus Scutillya
 Scutillya verrucosa (Giant spotted pyrgomorph)

Phymateini 
Bolívar, 1884; Distribution: Africa (incl. Madagascar), China

 Genus Paraphymateus
 Genus Phymateus
 Genus Physemophorus
 Genus Phyteumas
 Genus Rutidoderes
 Genus Zonocerus

Poekilocerini 
Burmeister, 1840; Distribution: Africa, India, Indo-China, Malesia, PNG
 Genus Poekilocerus Serville, 1831

Psednurini 
Burr, 1904; Distribution: Australia
 Genus Propsednura
 Propsednura eyrei
 Propsednura peninsularis
 Genus Psedna
 Psedna nana
 Genus Psednura
 Psednura longicornis
 Psednura musgravei
 Psednura pedestris

Pseudomorphacridini 
Kevan & Akbar, 1964; Distribution: Indo-China
 Genus Pseudomorphacris Carl, 1916

Pyrgomorphini 
Brunner von Wattenwyl, 1874; distribution: Africa, Southern Europe, W. Asia through to Indochina
subtribe Arbusculina Kevan, Akbar & Chang, 1975 (Cambodia)
 Arbuscula (insect) Bolívar, 1905 monotypic Arbuscula cambodjiana Bolívar, 1905
subtribe Geloiodina Kevan, Akbar & Chang, 1975 (W African islands)
 Geloiodes Chopard, 1958
subtribe Parasphenina Kevan & Akbar, 1964 (Africa)
 Afrosphena Kevan, 1956
 Afrosphenella Kevan & Akbar, 1963
 Chirindites Ramme, 1929
 Parasphena Bolívar, 1884
 Parasphenella Kevan, 1956
 Parasphenula Kevan, 1956
 Pezotagasta Uvarov, 1953
 Stenoscepa Karsch, 1896
subtribe Pyrgomorphina Brunner von Wattenwyl, 1874
 Anarchita Bolívar, 1904
 Carinisphena Kevan, 1966
 Laufferia Bolívar, 1904
 Leptea Bolívar, 1904
 Macroleptea Kevan, 1962
 †Miopyrgomorpha Kevan, 1964
 Ochrophlebia Stål, 1873
 Ochrophlegma Bolívar, 1904
 Phymella Uvarov, 1922
 Plerisca Bolívar, 1904
 Protanita Kevan, 1962
 Punctisphena Kevan, 1961
 Pyrgomorpha Serville, 1838
 Pyrgomorphella Bolívar, 1904
 Pyrgomorphellula Kevan & Hsiung, 1988
 Pyrgomorphula Kevan & Akbar, 1963
 Scabropyrgus Kevan, 1962
 Somalopyrgus Kevan & Akbar, 1964
 Tanita Bolívar, 1904
 Tanitella Kevan, 1962
 Zarytes Bolívar, 1904

Schulthessiini 
Kevan & Akbar, 1964; Distribution: Madagascar
 Genus Buyssoniella Bolívar, 1905
 Genus Schulthessia Bolívar, 1905

Sphenariini 
Bolívar, 1884 - Central America, Africa, China
 Sub-tribe Mekongianina Kevan & Akbar, 1964
 Genus Mekongiana Uvarov, 1940
 Genus Mekongiella Kevan, 1966
 Genus Yunnanites Uvarov, 1925
 Sub-tribe Rubelliina Kevan & Akbar, 1964
 Genus Rubellia Stål, 1875
 Sub-tribe Sphenariina Bolívar, 1884
 Genus Jaragua (insect) Perez-Gelabert, Dominici & Hierro, 1995
 Genus Prosphena Bolívar, 1884
 Genus Sphenarium Charpentier, 1845
 Sub-tribe Sphenexiina Kevan & Akbar, 1964
 Genus Sphenexia Karsch, 1896
 Genus Xenephias Kevan, 1973

Tagastini 
Bolívar, 1905; Distribution: SE Asia
 Genus Annandalea Bolívar, 1905
 Genus Tagasta Bolívar, 1905

Taphronotini 
Bolívar, 1904; Distribution: Africa, India, Indo-China

 Genus Aularches Stål, 1873; monotypic: A. miliaris
 Genus Taphronota Stål, 1873

Tribe not assigned 
All genera are monotypic:
 Eilenbergia: E. sagitta Mason, 1979
 Megalopyrga: M. monochroma Baccetti, 1985
 Paramekongiella: P. zhongdianensis Huang, 1990
 Xiphipyrgus: X. tunstalli Kevan, 1982

References

External links 

Orthoptera subfamilies
Pyrgomorphidae